Benum is a Norwegian surname. People with the surname include:

 Edgeir Benum (born 1939), Norwegian historian
 Jarle Benum (1928–2021), Norwegian politician 
 Olav Benum (1897–1990), Norwegian politician 
 Pål Benum (1935–2021), Norwegian long-distance runner

Norwegian-language surnames